Martin Kližan (born 11 July 1989) is a Slovak former professional tennis player. The winner of the 2006 French Open boys' singles title, Kližan turned pro in 2007 and had a career-high singles ranking of world No. 24, achieved on 27 April 2015, and world No. 73 in doubles, achieved on 4 May 2015.

Career

Junior career
In 2005, he won the European Junior Championship in the under-16 category, in both singles and doubles. In doubles, his partner was compatriot Andrej Martin. Kližan then went on to win the 2006 French Open boys' singles competition.

As a junior, Kližan posted a 54–21 win–loss record in singles and 58–18 in doubles. He reached the boys' No. 1 combined world ranking on 1 January 2007.

2010–11: Top 100 debut 
In 2010, Kližan qualified for the US Open. In his first main-draw Grand Slam tournament appearance, he lost to former world No. 1 Juan Carlos Ferrero in the first round. Later in the year, Kližan won his first Challenger tournament as a wildcard in his hometown of Bratislava at the Slovak Open. He would subsequently break into the top 100 in September of the following year.

2012: Best Grand Slam fourth round run, Top 30 debut 
In 2012, Kližan made it to five Challenger tour finals, winning four, in the space of just two months between March and May. He made it to the second round of a Grand Slam for the first time in his career at the 2012 French Open, before succumbing to Nicolas Mahut in four sets, despite taking the first. These results propelled him into the top 100 of the rankings for the first time in his career. He also reached the semifinals in Kitzbuhel. In his Wimbledon debut, he defeated Juan Ignacio Chela 11–9 in the fifth set in the first round, before losing in five sets to Viktor Troicki in the second round, despite being 2–1 up in sets. He competed in men's singles at the 2012 Summer Olympics, as well as the men's doubles with Lukáš Lacko.

At the 2012 US Open, Kližan advanced to the fourth round of a Grand Slam for the first time in his career, upsetting fifth seeded Jo-Wilfried Tsonga in the second round in four sets. Prior to the upset, Klizan had never beaten a player ranked higher than 49th on the ATP Tour. He beat Jérémy Chardy in straight sets to reach the fourth round, where he lost to Marin Čilić. He then won two respective Davis Cup matches against João Sousa and Gastão Elias in a tie against Portugal.

Kližan continued his good form two weeks after the US Open by winning his first ATP tournament, beating Fabio Fognini in the final of the 2012 St. Petersburg Open. Due to this result, he finished the year as World No. 30 after having finished the previous year as World No. 117.

2013: Loss of form 
Coming into 2013, Kližan was expected to reach at least the top 20. However, with his inconsistent nature, Kližan alternated good results with very bad ones. After first-round losses at the start of the season, he reached the quarterfinals in Rotterdam. Due to this result, he reached his career-high singles ranking of World No. 26.

He went on with poor results until the semifinals in Casablanca. At the 2013 French Open, he lost in the second round against eventual champion Rafael Nadal, despite winning the first set. Subsequently, he participated in a Challenger tournament in Caltanissetta, Italy, where Kližan suffered a shocking loss to non-ranked player Pablo Carreno Busta in the first round. Afterwards, Klizan returned to the main tour and after reaching the quarterfinals in Umag and winning his first-round match in Montreal against Thomaz Bellucci, lost in the first round of every tournament, peaking at the 2013 US Open, where he lost to Donald Young. He did not play for six weeks due to a wrist injury and withdrew from St. Petersburg, where he was the defending champion.

2014: Return to form, First Australian and French Open third rounds 

Kližan started the year with a first-round loss at the Nouméa, New Caledonia Challenger tournament to World No. 258 Kimmer Coppejans. After a poor start of the year, he found very good subsequent form at the Australian Open. Starting from qualifying, his achieved his best result in Australia by reaching the third round as a lucky loser, where he lost to another lucky loser: Stéphane Robert.

He continued his good form at the 500 tournament in Rio. Starting again from qualifying, he reached the second round. This result saw Kližan return to the top 100 of the rankings at World No. 97. In São Paulo, Kližan reached the quarterfinals, where he lost to semifinalist Thomaz Bellucci.

Starting from qualifying once more, Kližan surprisingly won the BMW Open, beating Mikhail Youzhny and Tommy Haas en route to the final, where he defeated top seeded Fabio Fognini. It was the second final and second title in Kližan's main-circuit career. He won both titles beating Fognini in the final.

At Roland Garros, Kližan had his best French Open result to date. He reached the third round after defeating World No. 11 Kei Nishikori in straight sets and Robin Haase.
At the beginning of the grass season, he reached the quarterfinals, where he was beaten by Richard Gasquet in Eastbourne. At Wimbledon, he lost in the first round in four sets to former champion Rafael Nadal.

At the China Open, Kližan got revenge by turning the tables on Nadal, defeating him in the quarterfinals.

2015–16: Top 25 debut, 2 ATP 500 titles 
Kližan played at the 2015 Australian Open as the 32nd seed. He retired from his second-round match against João Sousa.

Kližan won his third ATP doubles title at the Rio Open, partnering Philipp Oswald.

He played two singles matches and also the doubles match in a Davis Cup tie against Slovenia, which Slovakia won 5–0. Originally, the Slovak nominations were announced without Kližan, but he later changed his decision and decided to partake in the tie.

In April, Kližan won his third ATP title in Casablanca, defeating Daniel Gimeno Traver in the final. In Barcelona, he reached the semifinals, where he lost to eventual champion Kei Nishikori.

At the 2015 French Open, Kližan defeated Frances Tiafoe in the first round and lost to Gilles Simon in the second round. He then received wild card into challenger in Prostějov. He defeated fellow Slovak player Norbert Gombos in the first round, but lost in the second round to young Serbian player Laslo Djere.

At Wimbledon, Kližan lost in the first round to Fernando Verdasco.

In July, Kližan again played Davis Cup for Slovakia and won both his matches.

At the US Open, he won his first match against Florian Mayer. However, in the second round he lost to 27th seed Jérémy Chardy. In September, he reached the semifinals in Metz.

Kližan started 2016 with first-round losses in Doha and Sydney. In the first round of the Australian Open, he lost in a five-setter to 24th seed Roberto Bautista Agut.

In February, Kližan reached the semifinals in Sofia, where he lost to Viktor Troicki.

He subsequently won his fourth title in Rotterdam, beating Gaël Monfils in the final, coming back from a set down. On his way to the title, Kližan saved eight match points (five against Roberto Bautista Agut and three against Nicolas Mahut).

Kližan seized his second ATP 500 title at the 2016 German Open, defeating Pablo Cuevas in the final in straight sets.

2017: Injuries, Four ATP quarterfinals, out of top 100 
Kližan started the season with in Chennai, where he received a bye in the first round and lost in the second round to Aljaž Bedene. This was followed by a first-round loss in Sydney, where he retired with a foot injury. He then lost a tight, five-set match against No. 4 seed Stan Wawrinka at the Australian Open.

Kližan reached the quarterfinals in both Sofia and Rotterdam. As he was the defending champion in Rotterdam, his ranking dropped substantially after these tournaments. In Acapulco, Kližan lost in the first round to top seed Novak Djokovic.

At the 2017 BNP Paribas Open, Kližan lost in the second round to Pablo Cuevas and in the first round of Miami in first round to Benoît Paire. This was followed by a first-round loss in Marrakesh to qualifier Laslo Djere. Kližan qualified for the main draw of the 2017 Monte-Carlo Rolex Masters, but he lost to Nicolás Almagro in the first round, after receiving two game penalties for unsportsmanlike conduct in the third set. 

In Budapest, Kližan defeated two qualifiers: Maximilian Marterer and Bjorn Fratangelo, before losing to top seed and eventual winner Lucas Pouille in the quarterfinals.

In Munich, Kližan defeated Nicolás Kicker and Mischa Zverev, before losing to Chung Hyeon in the quarterfinals.

At the 2017 French Open, Kližan defeated Laurent Lokoli in the first round before losing to World No. 1 Andy Murray. This was followed by two Challengers, where he played as the top seed. In Prostějov, Kližan lost in the second round to qualifier Markus Eriksson (ranked 476 at the time). In Poprad-Tatry, he lost to Roberto Carballés Baena in the quarterfinals.

Kližan played one grass tournament before Wimbledon. In Antalya, he retired in his first-round match against Marsel İlhan. At Wimbledon, Kližan retired in the first round again, this time he played Novak Djokovic. After the points from winning the 2016 German Open were deducted, Kližan dropped out of the top 100.

2018: 6th ATP title 
Kližan reached the round of 16 at the Sofia Open, where he was defeated by Stan Wawrinka in three sets. In March, Kližan won the Indian Wells Challenger tournament.
At the Barcelona Open later in the year, he beat Novak Djokovic for the first time in five encounters (1–4). Kližan then lost in quarterfinals to Rafael Nadal. In Munich, Kližan qualified into the main draw and reached the quarterfinals, where he lost to Chung Hyeon.

Kližan qualified for the main draw at Roland Garros, where he lost in the second round to Gaël Monfils. During the grass season, Kližan did not play at any ATP tournaments.

Coming into the 2018 Generali Open Kitzbühel with a career record of 127–128 in singles, Kližan ensured his record would have more wins than losses by not only reaching the semifinals, but by also going on and winning the whole tournament. Kližan did just that, defeating Denis Istomin in the final, top seed Dominic Thiem as well as Dušan Lajović in the quarterfinals, against whom he saved two match points. Kližan and Thiem met again in St. Petersburg Open final, this time Thiem won. It was the first loss in 7 finals for Kližan in an ATP World Tour final.

2019: French Open third round
In Sydney, Kližan lost in the second round to Andreas Seppi. Kližan then lost in the first round of Australian Open to Jo-Wilfried Tsonga.

He reached the third round of the 2019 French Open for only the second time in his career by defeating 22nd seed local favorite Lucas Pouille.

Kližan played for Slovakia in Davis Cup match against Canada, he won one of his singles rubbers and also in doubles alongside Filip Polášek, but Slovakia eventually lost 2–3. In Sofia, Kližan reached quarterfinals, where he lost to the eventual champion Daniil Medvedev.

2021: Retirement
Martin Kližan's retirement to be announced after Wimbledon was reported on 2 June 2021, according to information published by the Slovakian Tennis Federation.
He played his last match at Wimbledon on 22 June 2021.

Career statistics

Grand Slam tournament performance timeline

Records

Criticism
In January 2022, Martin Kližan faced criticism after publishing post on Instagram, in which he attacked the sexual orientation of former tennis player [Martina Navrátilová] because of her statement towards tennis player [Novak Djokovič] regarding his refusal to be vaccinated. Kližan leaned against Navrátilová and called her "the most famous tennis lesbian" and said with contempt for her sexual orientation: "I do not know if Mrs. Navrátilová is aware of how the most important process in the world works, namely the process of human race reproduction, if by any chance she reads this post, then, Mrs. Navrátilová, a woman with a woman and a man with a man cannot conceive a newborn."

References

External links

 
 
 
 
 

1989 births
Living people
French Open junior champions
Tennis players from Bratislava
Slovak male tennis players
Tennis players at the 2012 Summer Olympics
Olympic tennis players of Slovakia
Grand Slam (tennis) champions in boys' singles